Turpinia is a genus of trees and shrubs in family Staphyleaceae, native to Asia and North, Central, and South America. Species include:

 Turpinia affinis
 Turpinia arguta
 Turpinia cochinchinensis
 Turpinia formosana
 Turpinia indochinensis
 Turpinia insignis
 Turpinia macrosperma
 Turpinia malabarica
 Turpinia megaphylla
 Turpinia montana
 Turpinia occidentalis
 Turpinia ovalifolia
 Turpinia parvifoliola
 Turpinia robusta
 Turpinia simplicifolia
 Turpinia sphaerocarpa
 Turpinia ternata
 Turpinia tricornuta

Fossil record
One fossil seed of †Turpinia ettingshausenii from the early Miocene has been found in the Czech part of the Zittau Basin.

References

Rosid genera
Staphyleaceae
Taxonomy articles created by Polbot